The men's road race at the 1955 UCI Road World Championships was the 22nd edition of the event. The race took place on Sunday 28 August 1955 in Frascati, Italy. The race was won by Stan Ockers of Belgium.

Final classification

References

Men's Road Race
UCI Road World Championships – Men's road race